16α-Methyl-11-oxoprednisolone, also known as dexamethasone impurity J, is a synthetic glucocorticoid corticosteroid which was reported in 1979 and was never marketed.

References

Diols
Glucocorticoids
Pregnanes
Triketones